The 2010 Home United FC season involves Home United competing in the 2010 S.League.

Squad

S.League squad

Transfers

Pre-season transfers

In

Out

Mid-season transfers

In

Out

Team statistics

Appearances and goals

Numbers in parentheses denote appearances as substitute.

Competitions

S.League

League table

Singapore Cup

Singapore League Cup

References

Home United
2010